The Community of St. Laurence (CSL) is an Anglican religious order of nuns.  Established in 1874, the order's house is located in Southwell, Nottinghamshire, England.  The community was originally established to provide pastoral care, but now focuses more on retreat work and assisting at the cathedral of the Diocese of Southwell.

References
Anglican Religious Communities Yearbook:  2004-2005.  Norwich:  Canterbury Press, 2003.

External links
 Information on the CSL from the Anglican Communion website].

Anglican orders and communities
Religious organizations established in 1874
Christian religious orders established in the 19th century
1874 establishments in England